The brown-tailed apalis (Apalis flavocincta) is a species of bird in the family Cisticolidae.

Taxonomy 
The brown-tailed apalis  was formerly was split from the yellow-breasted apalis as a distinct species by the IOC in 2021.

Range
It is found in Ethiopia and Sudan, and Uganda to Somalia and Kenya.

Habitat
Its natural habitats are subtropical or tropical dry forest, subtropical or tropical moist lowland forest, dry savanna, and moist savanna.

References

brown-tailed apalis
Birds of Sub-Saharan Africa
brown-tailed apalis
brown-tailed apalis